Indira Priyadarshini Vriksha Mitra Awards or IPVM Awards are given by Ministry of Environment and Forests of Government of India to individuals and institutions who have done pioneering and exemplary work in the field of afforestation and wasteland development. A cash award of Rupees Two lakh fifty thousand is presented to individuals/institutions in seven categories. It was instituted in 1986 and were given annually. Initially, IPVM awards were given in twelve categories till 2006. But as per 2012 notification of Ministry of Environment and Forests Seven Categories are approved for IPVM Awards.

Criteria
As per the Press Information Bureau of Government of India the activities deciding the awards are
establishing decentralized nurseries; tree planting on wastelands/farm land; awareness- raising, motivations and extension work; involving the rural poor/ tribal / cooperatives in Afforestation and tree planting; setting up grass-roots level institutions like the Tree Growers’ Cooperative; and social fencing of community woodlots and pasture lands.

Categories
 Individual-Forest Officers
 Individual-Other than Forest Officers
 Institutions/Organisations under Government
 Joint Forest Management Committees ( six awards region-wise)
 Non-profit making Voluntary Organisations (NGOs)
 Corporate Sector (Private/Public Sector Agencies)
 Eco-Clubs at School Level (covered under National Green Corps Programme of the Ministry of Environment and Forests)

Recipients

See also
 Indian Council of Forestry Research and Education
 Van Vigyan Kendra (VVK) Forest Science Centres
 List of environmental awards

References

Environmental awards
Ministry of Environment, Forest and Climate Change